Ted Garry (born 7 March 1885 in Renton) was a Scottish footballer and football manager.

He played for Galston, Celtic, and Derby County. He also had loan spells with Ayr, Stenhousemuir, Bradford (Park Avenue) A.F.C. and Dumbarton.
 
Garry later coached Espanyol of Spain.

References

1885 births
1955 deaths
Scottish footballers
Scottish expatriates in Spain
Galston F.C. players
Celtic F.C. players
Ayr F.C. players
Stenhousemuir F.C. players
Derby County F.C. players
Bradford City A.F.C. players
Dumbarton F.C. players
Scottish football managers
Scottish expatriate football managers
RCD Espanyol managers
Expatriate football managers in Spain
Scottish Football League players
English Football League players
Association football midfielders